New Luce is a civil parish in Dumfries and Galloway, south-west Scotland. New Luce is shown as a civil parish on John Ainslie's county map of 1782.

New Luce is also the principal village within the parish. The coast to coast walk, the Southern Upland Way, passes close to the village. The Covenanter Alexander Peden spent time preaching in the village.

Places of interest
A viaduct carried the Stranraer-Glasgow railway over the Main Water of Luce. Down the river from the viaduct is a pool called Bloody Wheel where the Hays of Castle of Park, near Glenluce (Old Luce), and the Linns of Larg in the adjoining parish of Inch, were said to have had a violent encounter centuries ago.

Archaeology
The Caves of Kilhern, between 2,000 and 3,000 years old, are in south New Luce.

Cairn na Gath ("cairn of the wild cat"), near Balmurrie, is a chambered long cairn dating to the neolithic (later stone-age).  At the south end there are remains of huts or enclosures. In addition, there are ancient hut circles at Lagafater, around 8 miles to the north of New Luce.

There is another Cairn Macneilie at Inch Parks, by Lochinch Castle in Inch Parish. They may have been named after a person who conducted archaeological excavations.

Forts
Rev. George Wilson, in his Archaeological and Historical Collections relating to Ayrshire and Galloway, lists forts in New Luce:

Cruise Back Fell, fort marked on the map as two cairns, 80 ft long, on the Fell of Cruise or High Galdenoch.
Gleniron Several fort with a cluster of green rings, and a large ditch and mote.
Mid Gleniron
Mid Gleniron tomb, where the long cairn had enclosed an earlier smaller one.
Garvilland Iron-age hill fort on the Bennan, double at the one end and with hut circles.
Klashherne, two rings, and three more, not on O.S. map.
Balmurrie, ring with two hut circles.

Gallery

See also
List of listed buildings in New Luce, Dumfries and Galloway

References 

Wigtownshire
Parishes in Dumfries and Galloway